This is a list of Billboard magazine's Top Hot 100 songs of 1981. The Top 100, as revealed in the year-end edition of Billboard dated December 26, 1981, is based on Hot 100 charts from the issue dates of November 1, 1980 through October 31, 1981.

See also
 1981 in music
 List of Billboard Hot 100 number-one singles of 1981
 List of Billboard Hot 100 top-ten singles in 1981

References

1981 record charts
Billboard charts